In 1794, three 64-gun third-rate ships were cut down to 44-gun fifth-rate frigates with a primary armament of 24-pounder guns, in a process known as razeeing. This was in response to rumours then circulating of very large French frigates supposed to be under construction. By Admiralty Order of 11 August 1794, two 64-gun ships of the Intrepid class – Anson and Magnanime – were to be cut down by one deck level.  By a subsequent Admiralty Order of 8 September 1794, a third 64-gun ship – the Indefatigable of the Ardent class – which had been launched but never commissioned in 1784, was similarly to be cut down.

The conversion retained the primary armament of twenty-six 24-pounder guns on the gun deck (but this deck became the upper deck rather than the lower deck), while the secondary armament became eight 12-pounder guns and four 32-pounder carronades on the quarter deck, and four 12-pounder guns and two 32-pounder carronades on the forecastle; the complement was reduced to 310 men.

Razeed ships of 1794 

HMS Anson
 Built at:  Plymouth Dockyard
 Launched:  4 January 1781
 Converted at:  Chatham Dockyard
 Converted:  July to December 1794 (for £8,426)
 Re-rated: 8 October 1794
 Fate:  Wrecked in Mounts Bay 29 December 1807
HMS Magnanime
 Built at:  Deptford Dockyard
 Launched:  14 October 1780
 Converted at:  Plymouth Dockyard
 Converted:  June 1794 to February 1795 (for £17,066)
 Re-rated: 8 November 1794
 Fate:  Broken up at Sheerness Dockyard in July 1813
HMS Indefatigable
 Built at:  Henry Adams's yard, Bucklers Hard
 Launched:  July 1784
 Converted at:  Portsmouth Dockyard
 Converted:  September 1794 to February 1795 (for £8,764)
 Rerated: 29 November 1794
 Fate:  Broken up at Sheerness Dockyard in August 1816

References 

 Robert Gardiner, Frigates of the Napoleonic Wars, Chatham Publishing, London 2000.
 Rif Winfield, British Warships in the Age of Sail, Chatham Publishing, London 2005.

 
 
1794 ships